Aaron Fa'aoso is an Australian actor, screenwriter and producer, known for his roles in East West 101, The Straits (which he also wrote and produced) and Black Comedy. He established Lonestar Productions in 2013, which brings stories of the people of the Torres Strait Islands and north Queensland to the screen.

Early life and education
Fa'aoso was born into the Kheodal (Crocodile) and Samu (Emu) clans of Torres Strait Islanders people, his family having moved from Saibai Island to Australia in 1947. He is also of Samoan and Tongan descent. He grew up in "a big Torres Strait Islander community" in Bamaga on the Cape York Peninsula, Queensland.

He graduated high school, and worked as a sexual health worker in Bamaga, and played rugby league football in the Australian Rugby League and Super League competitions. He moved from Cairns to Sydney to pursue a rugby career, joining the Canterbury Bulldogs rugby league club.

Career
Fa'aoso began his acting television career in 2006, where he played Eddie Gaibui on RAN, a six-part drama which aired on SBS One. In late 2007 to early 2008 he appeared in the first series another SBS drama series, East West 101, playing Detective Sonny Koa. Later that year he had a guest role in Sea Patrol, which aired on Network Nine.

In 2009 he appeared in season two of East West 101 and starred in the film Subdivision. In 2011, he returned to star in the third and final season of East West 101 on SBS.

In 2012, he appeared the last four episodes of the Australian drama TV series Bikie Wars: Brothers in Arms.

Also in 2012, he wrote, produced and starred in ABC Television's's 10-part drama series The Straits , about a north Queensland crime family. The series was highly praised by critics, with one calling it The Sopranos of the Top End.

Fa'aoso has appeared as a recurring character in the ABC sketch comedy series, Black Comedy (2014–2020).

Lonestar Productions
Fa'aso's main interest is in telling Indigenous stories. To that end, he created Lonestar Productions in 2013. The company makes films in the Torres Strait and Cape York regions, and has produced documentary series such as Blue Water Empire (about the history of the Torres Strait Islander people) and Strait to the Plate (food in the islands), in which Fa'aoso features.

Other roles
Since at least 2018 and  Fa'aoso is on the board of Screen Queensland.

Awards
 2006: Nominated at the AFI Awards for Best Guest or Supporting Actor in Television Drama for RAN
 2007: Nominated at the Logies for Graham Kennedy Award for Most Outstanding New Talent for RAN
 2011: Finalist in the Deadly Awards, for Male Actor of the Year
 2012: Winner, Deadly Awards, Television Show of the Year, for The Straits
 2012: Winner, AWGIE Award, Television Mini-Series – Original, for The Straits<

Filmography

Film

Television

Personal life
In 2012 he pleaded guilty to wilful damage and disorderly conduct following an incident at a Cairns nightclub and was placed on a good behaviour bond for six months and ordered to pay costs plus damages. The incident happened on the anniversary of a family tragedy, and the magistrate took into account Fa'aoso's previous good character. Cairns Mayor Val Schier described Fa'aoso as "a role model who is highly regarded"

References

External links
 
 

Living people
1976 births
21st-century Australian male actors
Actors of Samoan descent
Australian male film actors
Australian male television actors
Australian people of Samoan descent
Australian people of Tongan descent
Indigenous Australian male actors
Torres Strait Islands culture